The following is a list of handball clubs in Qatar currently participating in the Qatar Handball League:

Al Rayyan SC
Al Sadd SC
El Jaish SC
Lekhwiya SC
Al Khor SC
Qatar SC
Al Qiyadah SC
Al Arabi SC
Al Gharafa SC
Al Wakrah SC
Al Ahli SC
Al Shamal SC

References

 
Clubs
Qatar sport-related lists
Qatar
Lists of sports clubs in Qatar